Kevin Bradley may refer to:

 Kevin Bradley (Scottish footballer) (born 1986), Scottish football midfielder
 Kevin Bradley (American football), American football coach
 Kevin Bradley (Australian footballer) (1931–2013), Australian rules footballer